The Aetolia-Acarnania Folklore Museum is a museum in Agrinio, Greece.

The museum was founded in 1977 by the pan-Aetolia-Acarnania women's association.

References

External links
Municipality of Agrinio Museum info and photos

Folk museums in Greece
Museums established in 1977
Museums in Western Greece
Agrinio